RTV Vikom is a Bosnian commercial television channel based in Gradiška, Bosnia and Herzegovina. The program is mainly produced in Serbian. The TV station was established in 1997.

References

External links 
 Communications Regulatory Agency of Bosnia and Herzegovina

Mass media in Gradiška, Bosnia and Herzegovina
Television stations in Bosnia and Herzegovina
Television channels and stations established in 1997